Li Xiong (李雄) (274–334), courtesy name Zhongjuan (仲雋), formally Emperor Wu of Cheng (Han) (成(漢)武帝), was the first emperor of the Di-led Chinese Cheng Han dynasty and commonly regarded as its founder (although some historians date Cheng Han's founding to Li Xiong's father Li Te).  Li Xiong's declaration of himself as the Prince of Chengdu in 304 (and thus, independence from Jin Dynasty (266–420)) is commonly regarded as the start of the Sixteen Kingdoms era. The Book of Jin describes Li Xiong as a beautiful-looking and courageous man who was over two meters tall.

Participation in his father's and uncle's campaigns 
Li Xiong, Li Te's third son, by his wife Lady Luo, was first mentioned in history as having been commissioned by his father as a general in winter 301, after his father had defeated a surprise attack by Xin Ran (辛冉), the chief aide to the Jin governor of Yi Province (modern Sichuan and Chongqing) Luo Shang and had been urged by the Qin Province (秦州, modern eastern Gansu) refugees that he led to assume imperial powers.  However, he did not come to the forefront of the action until spring 303 when Li Te, after a major victory over Luo, carelessly believed Luo's request for a truce (against the advice of Li Xiong himself and of Li Te's brother and Li Xiong's uncle Li Liu).  Luo subsequently made a surprise attack and killed Li Te.  The remnants of Li Te's army made Li Liu their leader and were able to fight back, but when Li Xiong's older brother Li Dang (李蕩) then died in battle, Li Liu became convinced that he should surrender to Jin authorities, against the advice of Li Xiong and another of Li Xiong's uncle, Li Xiang (李驤).  Li Xiong then, without Li Liu's knowledge, made a surprise attack against Jin forces, forcing them to withdraw.  From that point on, Li Liu trusted and followed Li Xiong's judgment.  In winter 303, Li Liu grew ill and, before his death, appointed Li Xiong his successor.

Reign 
In early 304, Li Xiong captured Chengdu, the capital of Yi Province, forcing Luo Shang to flee.  He then offered the throne to the hermit Fan Changsheng, who was respected by the refugees as a god-like figure and who had supplied his army with food.  Fan refused, and the generals then requested that Li declare himself emperor.  In winter 304, Li declared himself the Prince of Chengdu, effectively declaring independence from Jin.  He made Fan and elders of the Li clan his senior advisors.  In 306, he declared himself emperor and named his empire "Cheng" (成).  He also honored his mother Lady Luo as empress dowager and posthumously honored his father as an emperor.  For the next few years, he gradually pacified and stabilized his borders, occupying all of Yi Province—but then generally stopped, not expanding any further.  In particular, oddly enough, he made no serious attempts to capture Jin's Ning Province (寧州, modern Yunnan and Guizhou), to his southwest.  (Very late in his reign, in 333, his cousin Li Shou was able to capture Ning Province.)  He appeared to, by his actions and inactions, seek to rest his people and stabilize his regime.  One area of contention that he did have with Jin was over Liang Province (梁州, modern southern Shaanxi, not to be confused with the more important 涼州 (modern central and western Gansu)), which during his reigns reverted several times between Jin and Cheng Han rule.

Historians generally viewed Li Xiong's reign of Cheng Han as one characterized by leniency and lack of interference with the people's livelihoods.  As Li's empire was generally peaceful during his reign while other places were ravaged by warfare, his empire received large numbers of refugees who settled down and added to the richness of the realm.  He was also not wasteful.  However, he was also criticized for having lack of order in his government.  His officials were not given salaries, and therefore, when they needed supplies, they directly requisitioned the supplies from the people which, while in Li Xiong's reign did not appear to create massive corruption, appeared to do so in his successors' reigns.

Late in Li Xiong's reign, Zhang Jun, the leader of Former Liang, a Jin vassal state, made repeated overtures to him to ask him to remove his imperial title and become a Jin vassal.  Li Xiong did not do so, but continuously stated to Zhang that he would be willing to do so if Jin were able to be more revived.  He also maintained friendly relations with Zhang, and Cheng Han and Former Liang thereafter maintained a trade relationship.  Li Xiong also, with some reluctance, allowed Jin and Former Liang messengers to pass through his territory to communicate with each other.

Succession issues and death 
In 315, Li Xiong created his wife Lady Ren empress.  She was sonless, although Li Xiong had more than 10 sons by concubines.  Li Xiong, however, resolved in 324 to create his nephew Li Ban, the son of Li Dang, who had been raised by Empress Ren, crown prince, reasoning that the empire's foundation was actually built by Li Te and Li Dang, and that it would be proper for him to pass the throne to Li Dang's son.  He also valued Li Ban highly for his kindness and studiousness.  Li Xiang and Wang Da (王達), foreseeing that this action would bring succession issues, objected, but were overruled by Li Xiong.

In 334, Li Xiong grew ill from an infected head wound, which then spread to other wounds that he had suffered over the years over his body.  His body was said to be causing such a great stench that his sons avoided him, but Li Ban cared for him day and night.  He died in summer 334 and was succeeded by Li Ban.  However, as Li Xiang had predicted, Li Xiong's sons were unhappy they were passed over, and later in the year, his son Li Yue (李越) assassinated Li Ban and made another son of his, Li Qi, emperor.  Under Li Qi's rule, Cheng Han began to decline.

Personal information 
 Father
 Li Te (third son of)
 Mother
 Empress Dowager Luo
 Wife
 Empress Ren (created 315)
 Major Concubines
 Consort Ran, mother of Prince Qi
 Children (Li Xiong was said to have more than 10 sons, but most were not mentioned in historical records)
 Li Yue (李越), the Prince of Jianning (created 334, executed)
 Li Ba (李霸), died (likely poisoned) during Li Qi's reign
 Li Qi (李期), later emperor
 Li Bao (李保), died (likely poisoned) during Li Qi's reign

4th-century Chinese monarchs
Cheng Han emperors
274 births
334 deaths
Founding monarchs